Papalote is an unincorporated community in Bee County, in the U.S. state of Texas. According to the Handbook of Texas, the community had a population of 70 in 2000. It is located within the Beeville micropolitan area.

History
Papalote has a long and rich history. The community, one of Bee County's oldest, was first settled on Papalote Creek and its name was reported to either be from a Karankawa word for "kite" or a Mexican Spanish word for "windmill" or "powered by air". Some of the community's first settlers included Robert Carlisle, Brigida Quinn Black, and brothers Patrick and William Quinn. These settlers immigrated from Ireland in 1828 and obtained land grants from Mexico. There were three separate communities in the area by 1857. The first one was Lower Papalote, also known as Steenville. This community had the first store that was owned by R.W. Steen, as well as a church, a post office, and a large Protestant population. The second one was Central Papalote, also known as Cravensville. This community developed around a lumber business that was started by Felix Hart. It was named Cravensville by the local Craven family. It was predominantly Catholic and the first Catholic church was built in 1871. A community center named Chattam Hall was built in 1900 on land donated by W.B. Hatch. The third one was Upper Papalote, also known as Murdock Place or Spangle Field. This community was the site of a store that was owned by Luke Hart on the south side of the creek from the other two communities. It is unknown if either Upper or Central Papalote was also known as Harts. The lower part of the Papalote community had residents move to nearby Mineral, and all three of these communities came together as one in the mid-1880s. Papalote had several saloons, churches, two stores, a meat market, a saddle shop, a gristmill, and a doctor in 1872. It held the most votes in Bee County until 1880. The community had several post offices. One named Papalota was in operation from 1860 to 1866 in Lower Papalote. Another one named Popolote opened in Central Papalote in 1870, renamed itself Papalote in 1883, and shut down in 1923. It reopened in 1926 and remained in operation until 1953. Mail was then delivered from Sinton. The San Antonio and Aransas Pass Railroad built a track through the community in 1886, on a right-of-way donated by Hatch. A depot was also built on the railroad and was then moved to Skidmore. That same year, the German-American Land Company bought land from Hatch and gave it to new settlers from Iowa and Hawaii. They planted orange orchards on their  of land. It all came to an end when a freeze destroyed the project, forcing residents to move to other communities and the land titles being returned to Hatch's possession. It was revived by a canning factory, a hotel, and a tinsmith and blacksmith shop in 1910, but with no further development. A hurricane destroyed Papalote's Baptist church in 1919. It had a population of 52 in 1890, 134 in 1904, and 50 in the 1930s. There were several scattered homes in the area in 1936 and had three businesses, Chattam Hall, and a cemetery on the south side of Papalote Creek at the site of the former Upper Papalote in 1983. The community's population was 70 from 1968 through 2000.

Geography

Education
The first school in the community was in Lower Papalote. Another Lower Papalote school had 81 students enrolled in 1876. It was replaced by a central school in 1888, which had 34 students enrolled in 1898. There was also a school in Papalote in 1936. Today, the community is served by the Skidmore-Tynan Independent School District.

References

Unincorporated communities in Bee County, Texas
Unincorporated communities in Texas